Herta Müller (born 17 August 1953) is a Romanian-born German novelist, poet, essayist and recipient of the 2009 Nobel Prize in Literature. Born in Nițchidorf, Timiș County in Romania, her native language is German. Since the early 1990s, she has been internationally established, and her works have been translated into more than twenty languages.

Müller is noted for her works depicting the effects of violence, cruelty and terror, usually in the setting of the Socialist Republic of Romania under the repressive Nicolae Ceaușescu regime which she has experienced herself. Many of her works are told from the viewpoint of the German minority in Romania and are also a depiction of the modern history of the Germans in the Banat and Transylvania. Her much acclaimed 2009 novel The Hunger Angel (Atemschaukel) portrays the deportation of Romania's German minority to Soviet Gulags during the Soviet occupation of Romania for use as German forced labor.

Müller has received more than twenty awards to date, including the Kleist Prize (1994), the Aristeion Prize (1995), the International Dublin Literary Award (1998) and the Franz Werfel Human Rights Award (2009). On 8 October 2009, the Swedish Academy announced that she had been awarded the Nobel Prize in Literature, describing her as a woman "who, with the concentration of poetry and the frankness of prose, depicts the landscape of the dispossessed".

Early life 
Müller was born to Banat Swabian Catholic farmers in Nițchidorf (German: Nitzkydorf; Hungarian: Niczkyfalva), up to the 1980s a German-speaking village in the Romanian Banat in southwestern Romania,until 1920 part of the Kingdom of Hungary.  Her family was part of Romania's German minority. Her grandfather had been a wealthy farmer and merchant, but his property was confiscated by the Communist regime. Her father was a member of the Waffen SS during World War II, and earned a living as a truck driver in Communist Romania. In 1945, her mother,born 1928 as Katarina Gion,  then aged 17, was among 100,000 of the German minority deported to forced labor camps in the Soviet Union, from which she was released in 1950. Müller's native language is German; she learned Romanian only in grammar school. She graduated from Nikolaus Lenau High School before becoming student of German studies and Romanian literature at West University of Timișoara.

In 1976, Müller began working as a translator for an engineering factory, but was dismissed in 1979 for her refusal to cooperate with the Securitate, the Communist regime's secret police. After her dismissal, she initially earned a living by teaching in kindergarten and giving private German lessons.

Career 
Müller's first book, Niederungen (Nadirs), was published in Romania in German in 1982, receiving a prize from the Central Committee of the Union of Communist Youth. The book was about a child's view of the German-cultural Banat. Some members of the Banat Swabian community criticized Müller for "fouling her own nest" by her unsympathetic portrayal of village life. Müller was a member of Aktionsgruppe Banat, a group of German-speaking writers in Romania who supported freedom of speech over the censorship they faced under Nicolae Ceaușescu's government, and her works, including The Land of Green Plums, deal with these issues. Radu Tinu, the Securitate officer in charge of her case, denies that she ever suffered any persecutions, a claim that is opposed by Müller's own version of her (ongoing) persecution in an article in the German weekly Die Zeit in July 2009.

After being refused permission to emigrate to West Germany in 1985, Müller was finally allowed to leave along with her then-husband, novelist Richard Wagner, in 1987, and they settled in West Berlin, where both still live. In the following years, she accepted lectureships at universities in Germany and abroad. Müller was elected to membership in the Deutsche Akademie für Sprache und Dichtung in 1995, and other honorary positions followed. In 1997, she withdrew from the PEN centre of Germany in protest of its merger with the former German Democratic Republic branch. In July 2008, Müller sent a critical open letter to Horia-Roman Patapievici, president of the Romanian Cultural Institute in reaction to the moral and financial support given by the institute to two former informants of the Securitate participating at the Romanian-German Summer School.

The critic Denis Scheck described visiting Müller at her home in Berlin and seeing that her desk contained a drawer full of single letters cut from a newspaper she had entirely destroyed in the process. Realising that she used the letters to write texts, he felt he had "entered the workshop of a true poet".

The Passport, first published in Germany as Der Mensch ist ein großer Fasan auf der Welt in 1986, is, according to The Times Literary Supplement, couched in the strange code engendered by repression: indecipherable because there is nothing specific to decipher, it is candid, but somehow beside the point, redolent of things unsaid. From odd observations the villagers sometimes make ("Man is nothing but a pheasant in the world"), to chapters titled after unimportant props ("The Pot Hole", "The Needle"), everything points to a strategy of displaced meaning ... Every such incidence of misdirection is the whole book in miniature, for although Ceausescu is never mentioned, he is central to the story, and cannot be forgotten. The resulting sense that anything, indeed everything – whether spoken by the characters or described by the author – is potentially dense with tacit significance means this short novel expands in the mind to occupy an emotional space far beyond its size or the seeming simplicity of its story."

2009 success 

In 2009, Müller enjoyed the greatest international success of her career. Her novel Atemschaukel (published in English as The Hunger Angel) was nominated for the Deutscher Buchpreis (German Book Prize) and won the Franz Werfel Human Rights Award. In this book, Müller describes the journey of a young man to a gulag in the Soviet Union, the fate of many Germans in Transylvania after World War II. It was inspired by the experience of poet Oskar Pastior, whose memories she had made notes of, and also by what happened to her own mother.

In October 2009, the Swedish Academy announced its decision to award that year's Nobel Prize in Literature to Müller "who, with the concentration of poetry and the frankness of prose, depicts the landscape of the dispossessed." The academy compared Müller's style and her use of German as a minority language with Franz Kafka and pointed out the influence of Kafka on Müller. The award coincided with the 20th anniversary of the fall of communism. Michael Krüger, head of Müller's publishing house, said: "By giving the award to Herta Müller, who grew up in a German-speaking minority in Romania, the committee has recognized an author who refuses to let the inhumane side of life under communism be forgotten"

In 2012, Müller commented on the Nobel Prize for Mo Yan by saying that the Swedish Academy had apparently chosen an author who 'celebrates censorship'.

On July 6, 2020 a no longer existing Twitter account published the fake news of Herta Müller's death, which was immediately disclaimed by her publisher.

Influences 
Although Müller has revealed little about the specific people or books that have influenced her, she has acknowledged the importance of her university studies in German and Romanian literature, and particularly of the contrast between the two languages. "The two languages", the writer says, "look differently even at plants. In Romanian, 'snowdrops' are 'little tears', in German they are 'Schneeglöckchen', that is 'little snow bells', which means we're not only speaking about different words, but about different worlds." (However here she confuses snowdrops with lily-of-the-valley, the latter being called 'little tears' in Romanian.) She continues, "Romanians see a falling star and say that someone has died, with the Germans you make a wish when you see the falling star." Romanian folk music is another influence: "When I first heard Maria Tănase she sounded incredible to me, it was for the first time that I really felt what folklore meant. Romanian folk music is connected to existence in a very meaningful way."

Müller's work was also shaped by the many experiences she shared with her ex-husband, the novelist and essayist Richard Wagner. Both grew up in Romania as members of the Banat Swabian ethnic group and enrolled in German and Romanian literary studies at Timișoara University. Upon graduating, both worked as German-language teachers, and were members of Aktionsgruppe Banat, a literary society that fought for freedom of speech.

Müller's involvement with Aktionsgruppe Banat gave her the courage to write boldly, despite the threats and trouble generated by the Romanian secret police. Although her books are fictional, they are based on real people and experiences. Her 1996 novel, The Land of Green Plums, was written after the deaths of two friends, in which Müller suspected the involvement of the secret police, and one of its characters was based on a close friend from Aktionsgruppe Banat.

Letter from Liu Xia 
Herta Müller wrote the foreword for the first publication of the poetry of Liu Xia, wife of the imprisoned Nobel Peace Prize recipient Liu Xiaobo, in 2015. Müller also translated and read a few of Liu Xia poems in 2014. On 4 December 2017, a photo of the letter to Herta Müller from Liu Xia in a form of poem was posted on Facebook by Chinese dissident Liao Yiwu, where Liu Xia said that she was going mad in her solitary life.

Works

Prose 

 Niederungen, stories, censored version published in Bucharest, 1982; uncensored version published in Germany, 1984. Translated as Nadirs by Sieglinde Lug (University of Nebraska Press, 1999)
 Drückender Tango ("Oppressive Tango"), stories, Bucharest, 1984
 Der Mensch ist ein großer Fasan auf der Welt, Berlin, 1986. Translated as The Passport by Martin Chalmers (Serpent's Tail, 1989)
 Barfüßiger Februar ("Barefoot February"), Berlin, 1987
 Reisende auf einem Bein, Berlin, 1989. Translated as Traveling on One Leg by Valentina Glajar and Andre Lefevere (Hydra Books/Northwestern University Press, 1998)
 Der Teufel sitzt im Spiegel ("The Devil is Sitting in the Mirror"), Berlin, 1991
 Der Fuchs war damals schon der Jäger, Reinbek bei Hamburg, 1992. Translated as The Fox Was Ever the Hunter by Philip Boehm (2016)
 Eine warme Kartoffel ist ein warmes Bett ("A Warm Potato Is a Warm Bed"), Hamburg, 1992
 Der Wächter nimmt seinen Kamm ("The Guard Takes His Comb"), Reinbek bei Hamburg, 1993
 Angekommen wie nicht da ("Arrived As If Not There"), Lichtenfels, 1994
 Herztier, Reinbek bei Hamburg, 1994. Translated as The Land of Green Plums by Michael Hofmann (Metropolitan Books/Henry Holt & Company, 1996)
 Hunger und Seide ("Hunger and Silk"), essays, Reinbek bei Hamburg, 1995
 In der Falle ("In a Trap"), Göttingen 1996
 Heute wär ich mir lieber nicht begegnet, Reinbek bei Hamburg, 1997. Translated as The Appointment by Michael Hulse and Philip Boehm (Metropolitan Books/Picador, 2001)
 Der fremde Blick oder Das Leben ist ein Furz in der Laterne ("The Foreign View, or Life Is a Fart in a Lantern"), Göttingen, 1999
 Heimat ist das, was gesprochen wird ("Home Is What Is Spoken There"), Blieskastel, 2001
 A Good Person Is Worth as Much as a Piece of Bread, foreword to Kent Klich's Children of Ceausescu, published by Journal, 2001 and Umbrage Editions, 2001.
 Der König verneigt sich und tötet ("The King Bows and Kills"), essays, Munich (and elsewhere), 2003
 Atemschaukel, Munich, 2009. Translated as The Hunger Angel by Philip Boehm (Metropolitan Books, 2012)
 Immer derselbe Schnee und immer derselbe Onkel, 2011

Lyrics / found poetry 
 Im Haarknoten wohnt eine Dame ("A Lady Lives in the Hair Knot"), Rowohlt, Reinbek bei Hamburg, 2000
 Die blassen Herren mit den Mokkatassen ("The Pale Gentlemen with their Espresso Cups"), Carl Hanser Verlag, Munich, 2005
 Este sau nu este Ion ("Is He or Isn't He Ion"), collage-poetry written and published in Romanian, Iași, Polirom, 2005
 Vater telefoniert mit den Fliegen ("Father is calling the Flies"), Carl Hanser Verlag, Munich, 2012
 Father's on the Phone with the Flies: A Selection , Seagull Books, Munich, 2018 (73 collage poems with reproductions of originals)

Editor 
 Theodor Kramer: Die Wahrheit ist, man hat mir nichts getan ("The Truth Is No One Did Anything to Me"), Vienna 1999
 Die Handtasche ("The Purse"), Künzelsau 2001
 Wenn die Katze ein Pferd wäre, könnte man durch die Bäume reiten ("If the Cat Were a Horse, You Could Ride Through the Trees"), Künzelsau 2001

Filmography 
 1993:  Vulpe – vânător (Der Fuchs war damals schon der Jäger), directed by Stere Gulea, starring Oana Pellea, Dorel Vișan, George Alexandru etc.

Awards and honors 

 1981 Adam Müller-Guttenbrunn Prize of the Timișoara Literature Circle
 1984 Aspekte-Literaturpreis
 1985 Rauris Literature Prize
 1985 Encouragement Prize of the Literature Award of Bremen
 1987 Ricarda-Huch Prize of Darmstadt
 1989 Marieluise-Fleißer-Preis of Ingolstadt
 1989 German Language Prize, together with Gerhardt Csejka, Helmuth Frauendorfer, Klaus Hensel, Johann Lippet, Werner Söllner, William Totok, Richard Wagner
 1990 Roswitha Medal of Knowledge of Bad Gandersheim
 1991 Kranichsteiner Literature Prize
 1993 Critical Prize for Literature
 1994 Kleist Prize
 1995 Aristeion Prize
 1995/96 Stadtschreiber von Bergen
 1997 Literature Prize of Graz
 1998 Ida-Dehmel Literature Prize and the International Dublin Literary Award for The Land of Green Plums
 2001 Cicero Speaker Prize
 2002 Carl-Zuckmayer-Medaille of Rhineland-Palatinate
 2003 Joseph-Breitbach-Preis (together with Christoph Meckel and Harald Weinrich)
 2004 Literature Prize of Konrad-Adenauer-Stiftung
 2005 Berlin Literature Prize
 2006 Würth Prize for European Literature und Walter-Hasenclever Literature Prize
 2009 Nobel Prize in Literature
 2009 Franz Werfel Human Rights Award, in particular for her novel The Hunger Angel
 2010 Hoffmann von Fallersleben Prize
 2013 Best Translated Book Award, shortlist, The Hunger Angel
 2014 Hannelore Greve Literature Prize
 2021 Pour le Mérite for Sciences and Arts
 2022: Prize for Understanding and Tolerance, Jewish Museum Berlin
 2022 Brückepreis

See also 
 List of female Nobel laureates
 List of Nobel laureates in Literature

References

Further reading 
 Bettina Brandt and Valentina Glajar (Eds.), Herta Müller. Politics and aesthetics. University of Nebraska Press, Lincoln 2013. . pdf (excerpt)
 Nina Brodbeck, Schreckensbilder, Marburg 2000.
 Thomas Daum (ed.), Herta Müller, Frankfurt am Main 2003.
 Norbert Otto Eke (ed.), Die erfundene Wahrnehmung, Paderborn 1991.
 Valentina Glajar, "The Discourse of Discontent: Politics and Dictatorship in Hert Müller's Herztier." The German Legacy in East Central Europe. As Recorded in Recent German Language Literature Ed. Valentina Glajar. Camden House, Rochester NY 2004. 115–160.
 Valentina Glajar, "Banat-Swabian, Romanian, and German: Conflicting Identities in Herta Muller's Herztier." Monatshefte 89.4 (Winter 1997): 521–540.
 Maria S. Grewe, "Imagining the East: Some Thoughts on Contemporary Minority Literature in Germany and Exoticist Discourse in Literary Criticism." Germany and the Imagined East. Ed. Lee Roberts. Cambridge, 2005.
 Maria S. Grewe, Estranging Poetic: On the Poetic of the Foreign in Select Works by Herta Müller and Yoko Tawada, New York: Columbia UP, 2009.
 Brigid Haines, '"The Unforgettable Forgotten": The Traces of Trauma in Herta Müller's Reisende auf einem Bein, German Life and Letters, 55.3 (2002), 266–281.
 Brigid Haines and Margaret Littler, Contemporary German Women's Writing: Changing the Subject, Oxford: Oxford University Press, 2004.
 Brigid Haines (ed.), Herta Müller. Cardiff 1998.
 Martin A. Hainz, "Den eigenen Augen blind vertrauen? Über Rumänien." Der Hammer – Die Zeitung der Alten Schmiede 2 (Nov. 2004): 5–6.
 Herta Haupt-Cucuiu: Eine Poesie der Sinne [A Poetry of the Senses], Paderborn, 1996.
 Ralph Köhnen (ed.), Der Druck der Erfahrung treibt die Sprache in die Dichtung: Bildlickeit in Texten Herta Müllers, Frankfurt am Main: Peter Lang, 1997.
 
 Lyn Marven, Body and Narrative in Contemporary Literatures in German: Herta Müller, Libuse Moníková, Kerstin Hensel. Oxford: Oxford University Press, 2005.
 Grazziella Predoiu, Faszination und Provokation bei Herta Müller, Frankfurt am Main, 2000.
 Diana Schuster, Die Banater Autorengruppe: Selbstdarstellung und Rezeption in Rumänien und Deutschland. Konstanz: Hartung-Gorre-Verlag, 2004.
 Carmen Wagner, Sprache und Identität. Oldenburg, 2002.

 External links 

 Herta Müller, short biography by Professor of German Beverley Driver Eddy at Dickinson College
 Herta Müller: Bio, excerpts, interviews and articles in the archives of the Prague Writers' Festival
 Herta Müller, at complete reviewList of Works
 Herta Müller , profile by International Literature Festival Berlin. Retrieved on 7 October 2009
 Herta Müller interview by Radio Romania International on Aug 17, 2007. Retrieved on 7 October 2009
 "Securitate in all but name", by Herta Müller. About her ongoing fight with the Securitate, August 2009
 "Everything I Own I Carry with Me", excerpt from the novel. September 2009
 Poetry and Labor Camp: Literature Nobel Laureate Herta Müller Goethe-Institut, December 2009
 "The Evil of Banality" – A review of The Appointment by Costica Bradatan, The Globe and Mail, February 2010
 "Herta Müller: The 2009 Laureate of the Nobel Prize in Literature", Yemen Times "Half-lives in the shadow of starvation", review by Costica Bradatan of The Hunger Angel, The Australian, February 2013
 How could I forgive. An interview with Herta Müller Video by Louisiana Channel
 
  including the Nobel Lecture, 7 December 2009 Jedes Wort weiß etwas vom Teufelskreis''

1953 births
Living people
Banat Swabians
Danube-Swabian people
Romanian emigrants to West Germany
German anti-communists
German women essayists
German essayists
German Nobel laureates
German women poets
Kleist Prize winners
Knights Commander of the Order of Merit of the Federal Republic of Germany
Nobel laureates in Literature
People from Timiș County
German people of German-Romanian descent
Romanian dissidents
Romanian Nobel laureates
Romanian novelists
Romanian writers in German
Romanian women poets
Romanian schoolteachers
Romanian translators
Women Nobel laureates
20th-century German novelists
21st-century German novelists
20th-century German women writers
21st-century German women writers
German women novelists
21st-century German poets
20th-century German translators
21st-century translators
Members of the German Academy for Language and Literature
20th-century essayists
21st-century essayists
West University of Timișoara alumni
Writers from Berlin
Academic staff of the Free University of Berlin